Hypecoum procumbens is a species of annual herb in the family Papaveraceae. They have a self-supporting growth form and simple leaves. Individuals can grow to 40 cm tall.

Sources

References 

procumbens
Flora of Malta